Rules of Engagement is a 1991 video game published by Omnitrend Software and released in Amiga and DOS versions.

Gameplay
Rules of Engagement is a game of tactical starship combat in which players control a flagship and give orders to ships of its fleet.

Reception
Charles A. Smith reviewed the game for Computer Gaming World, and stated that "For this reviewer, Rules of Engagement is elegant. There are no gee-whiz 256-color images. Instead, graphic designer Maurice Molyneaux and programmer Thomas Carbone opted for austerity and functionality to transform one's machine into a computer with deadly potential fitting snugly into the game's fiction."

Reviews
Compute!
CU Amiga - Jan, 1992
Computer Gaming World - Nov, 1992
Amiga Action - Feb, 1992
Games-X - Aug, 1991
The One
Amiga Format

References

1991 video games
Amiga games
DOS games
Real-time strategy video games
Space combat simulators
Video games developed in the United States